The 1974 All-Ireland Senior Football Championship Final was the 87th All-Ireland Final and the deciding match of the 1974 All-Ireland Senior Football Championship, an inter-county Gaelic football tournament for the top teams in Ireland.

Galway led 1–4 to 0–5 at half-time with a Michael Rooney goal. Paddy Cullen saved a penalty kick (placed 17th in RTÉ's 2005 series Top 20 GAA Moments) and Kevin Heffernan's Dublin staged a comeback to win by five points. The penalty save (Liam Sammon took it) occurred at the Canal End of Croke Park.

It was Galway's second consecutive All-Ireland football final; they lost to Cork in 1973.

Paddy Devlin, who had previously taken charge of the 1972 replay, was the last Tyrone man to referee an All-Ireland SFC final until Sean Hurson took charge of the 2022 final.

References

External links

All-Ireland Senior Football Championship Final
All-Ireland Senior Football Championship Final, 1974
All-Ireland Senior Football Championship Finals
All-Ireland Senior Football Championship Finals
Dublin county football team matches
Galway county football team matches